= Burghofspiele Voitsberg =

Coordinates: 47°03′07″N 15°09′05″E

Burghofspiele Voitsberg is a theatre group in Austria.
